2020 Missouri Amendment 2, also known as the Medicaid Expansion Initiative, was a ballot measure to amend the Constitution of Missouri to expand Medicaid. The initiative was on the August 4, 2020 primary ballot, and passed with 53.27% of the vote.

Contents
The amendment appeared on the ballot as follows:

Results

See also
2020 Oklahoma Question 802, a similar ballot measure in Oklahoma
List of Missouri ballot measures
2020 Missouri elections

References

External links

Amendment 2
Missouri Amendment 2
Missouri ballot measures
Affordable Care Act
Constitution of Missouri